Oncophorus virens is a species of moss in the genus Oncophorus native to Alaska.

References

Flora of Alaska
Dicranales
Flora without expected TNC conservation status